Sigowet-Soin is an electoral constituency in Kericho County, Kenya. Its one of six Constituencies of Kericho County. It was created for 2013 General Elections after it being curved out of Belgut Constituency. First member of Parliament was Justice Kemei and currently the sitting MP for the constituency is Kipsengeret Koros.

It has four County Assembly Wards namely:

County Assembly Wards in Sigowet – Soin Constituency

Sigowet Ward 
 County Assembly Ward No.: 0962
 County Assembly Ward Name: Sigowet
 County Assembly Ward Population (Approx.): 36,175
 County Assembly Ward Area In Sq. km (Approx.): 72.80
 County Assembly Ward Description: Comprises Sigowet, Kaptebengwo, Kamaget, Kebeneti Mindililwet, Kiptere, Kakeburu and Cheptuiyet sub–Locations of Kericho County

I Ward No.: 0963
 County Assembly Ward Name: Kaplelartet
 County Assembly Ward Population (Approx.): 51,753
 County Assembly Ward Area In Sq. km (Approx.): 109.40
 County Assembly Ward Description: Comprises Kaplelartet, Kalyangowet, Singorok, Iraa, Motiret, Tabaita, Chepkemel and KAPSOMBOCH Sub–Locations of Kericho County

Soliat Ward 
 County Assembly Ward No.: 0964
 County Assembly Ward Name: Soliat
 County Assembly Ward Population (Approx.): 16,124
 County Assembly Ward Area In Sq. km (Approx.): 101.00
 County Assembly Ward Description: Comprises Baregeiwet, Kaitui, Kiptugumo, Kapsegut, Chesiche, Kabokyek, Lekwenyi, Kapkara, Kapsorok, Motero, Soliat, Kamasega and Kong’eren sub–Location of Kericho County

Soin Ward 
 County Assembly Ward No.: 0965
 County Assembly Ward Name: Soin
 County Assembly Ward Population (Approx.): 21,072
 County Assembly Ward Area In Sq. km (Approx.): 192.90
 County Assembly Ward Description: Comprises Simbi, Kaplelach, Kipsitet, Kapchebwai, Koitaborut, Kapkormon, Kejiriet and Kaptalamwa Sub–Locations of Kericho County

References 

Constituencies in Kericho County